Mohra Ghamiaran is a town in the Islamabad Capital Territory of Pakistan. It is located at 33° 25' 0N 73° 24' 20E with an altitude of 512 metres (1683 feet).

References 

Union councils of Islamabad Capital Territory